The Serie B 1967–68 was the thirty-sixth tournament of this competition played in Italy since its creation.

Teams
Monza, Perugia and Bari had been promoted from Serie C, while Lazio, Foggia, Venezia and Lecco had been relegated from Serie A.

Events
Transitional relegations were imposed to restore the format.

Final classification

Results

Relegation tie-breaker

First round
Classification

Results

Second round
Classification

Results

References and sources
Almanacco Illustrato del Calcio - La Storia 1898-2004, Panini Edizioni, Modena, September 2005

Serie B seasons
2
Italy